Coles Creek may refer to:

Australia
 Coles Creek, Queensland, a locality in the Gympie Region

United States

Coles Creek culture, a Late Woodland archaeological culture in the southern United States
Coles Creek (Mississippi), a tributary of the Mississippi River
Coles Creek (Pennsylvania), a tributary of Fishing Creek
Coles Creek State Park, in St. Lawrence County, New York

See also
Cole Creek (disambiguation)